Grigoriy Medvedyev (born 2 April 1964 in Alma-Ata, Kazakh SSR) is a Soviet sprint canoer who competed in the late 1980s. He won a gold medal in the K-4 10000 m event at the 1986 ICF Canoe Sprint World Championships in Montreal.

References

Living people
Kazakhstani male canoeists
Soviet male canoeists
1964 births
Sportspeople from Almaty
ICF Canoe Sprint World Championships medalists in kayak